Macedonian NLA may refer to:

 Macedonian National Liberation Army, a World War II-era Communist resistance army
 National Liberation Army (Macedonia), a guerrilla organization operating in 2001